The Serviço de Informações Estratégicas de Defesa or SIED (Portuguese for: Defense Strategic Information Service) is the foreign strategic intelligence agency of Portugal.

SIED's mission is to produce information aimed at safeguarding the national independence, the national interests and the external security of the Portuguese State. 

Together with the SIS (Portugueses domestic intelligence agency), the SIED is a component of the SIRP (Portuguese Intelligence System).

History
The existence of SIED was originally envisaged by the Law of the Information System of the Portuguese Republic in 1984. However, even before being activated, it was merged with the Military Information Service (SIM), originating the SIEDM (Strategic and Military Information Service). This was activated in 1997.

In 2004, the SIEDM lost its military component and was renamed SIED.

See also 
List of intelligence agencies
Sistema de Informações da República Portuguesa
PIDE

References

External links 
Official Website

Portuguese intelligence agencies